The 1996 ITC Norisring round was the fifth round of the 1996 International Touring Car Championship season. It took place on 23 June at the Norisring.

Klaus Ludwig won both races, driving an Opel Calibra V6 4x4.

Classification

Qualifying

Race 1

Race 2

Standings after the event

Drivers' Championship standings

Manufacturers' Championship standings

 Note: Only the top five positions are included for both sets of drivers' standings.

References

External links
Deutsche Tourenwagen Masters official website

1996 International Touring Car Championship season